Camera Obscura is a 2017 horror film directed by Aaron B. Koontz in his feature film directorial debut, with a script written by Koontz and his writing partner Cameron Burns. It stars Christopher Denham, Nadja Bobyleva, Noah Segan, Catherine Curtin, Chase Williamson, and Andrew Sensenig.

Premise
Jack, a war photographer suffering from post-traumatic stress disorder, sees imminent deaths in photographs he has taken with an old, antique camera.

Cast
Christopher Denham as Jack Zeller
Nadja Bobyleva as Claire Zeller
Catherine Curtin as Det. Dawson
Chase Williamson as Det. Ford
Noah Segan as Walt
Andrew Sensenig as Charlie Hibbert
Gretchen Lodge as Shannon
Jeremy King as Tad Buckely
Dane Rhodes as Camera Store Manager
David Jensen as Bernard
Charlie Talbert as Frank
Carol Sutton as Dr. Vogel
Lance E. Nichols as Lt. Vincent

Production
Aaron B. Koontz was inspired to write Camera Obscura after one of his co-workers had visited South America and the locals did not allow him to take pictures as "it would steal their souls". Koontz also cited a true story of a man with PTSD who attacked people on a freeway. While writing the film, Koontz looked towards Final Destination for inspiration, including Jeffrey Reddick's original draft.

While producing the film Starry Eyes, Koontz met actor Noah Segan, and the two began collaborating on the film. Impressed with their performances in Lovely Molly and John Dies at the End respectively, the director met with and cast Gretchen Lodge and Chase Williamson in 2013. Barbara Crampton had signed onto the film at one point, but dropped out due to her availability changing.

Production had begun in Baton Rouge, Louisiana by April 2016.

Release
Camera Obscura debuted at the Florida Film Festival on April 22, 2017. Prior to the film's premiere, Chiller Films acquired the rights to the film in April 2017. The film was released domestically on June 9, 2017 and on VOD on June 13, 2017.

Home media
The film was distributed on Blu-ray and DVD by Uncork'd  Entertainment on November 9, 2017.

Reception
On review aggregator Rotten Tomatoes, Camera Obscura holds an approval rating of 30% based on 20 reviews, with an average rating of 4.70/10. On Metacritic, the film holds an average rating of 35 out of 100 from 8 reviews, indicating "generally unfavorable reviews".

Dennis Harvey of Variety said the film was "definitely a cut above in genre terms, with room for some nicely drawn character writing and acting", singling out the performance of Curtin and Segan in particular. For Dread Central, Staci Layne Wilson wrote "there are enough moments of suspense and mystery to make it worth your while."

Writing for The Hollywood Reporter, Frank Scheck wrote "despite Denham’s impressively committed performance in the central role, Camera Obscura never achieves the proper focus." Michael Nordine of IndieWire said "nothing that’s made its way onscreen will unnerve you the way Jack’s photos unnerve him." Slant Magazine'''s Henry Stewart said the film goes "through the genre motions in the dullest way possible."

Future
In an interview with PopHorror'', director Aaron B. Koontz expressed an interest in a prequel film following Andrew Senseng's character. Koontz also claimed there was a "sound" idea for a sequel, however he'd prefer to let someone else direct it, if it were to be made.

References

American horror films
2017 directorial debut films
2017 horror films
Films shot in Louisiana
Films about photographers
Films about post-traumatic stress disorder
Films produced by Aaron B. Koontz
2010s English-language films
2010s American films